Bakan Rural District is a rural district (dehestan) in Hasanabad District, Eqlid County, Fars Province, Iran. At the 2006 census, its population was 3,274, in 720 families.  The rural district has 9 villages.

References 

Rural Districts of Fars Province
Eqlid County